Jamal Julian Campbell-Ryce (born 6 April 1983) is a former professional footballer who played as a winger. He is currently with Peterborough United as Manager of the U18s.

Born in Lambeth, Greater London he began his career with Charlton Athletic in 2001 from where he has moved to a number of clubs including Rotherham United, Southend United, Barnsley, Bristol City and Notts County before joining Sheffield United in 2014. He is also a former Jamaican international, qualifying through his parentage.

Career
Campbell-Ryce played a handful of games for Southend United in the 05/06 season during a loan deal from Rotherham United. However, the deal turned sour, and left him in the limbo so Rotherham recalled him and sent him to Colchester United to get some first team football. The tricky winger has also played for Charlton Athletic, Chesterfield (where he scored once in the Football League Trophy against Macclesfield), Wimbledon , Colchester and Leyton Orient.

Campbell-Ryce joined Southend in the summer of 2006 after a deal was agreed between Southend and Rotherham. As both Southend and Colchester were promoted to the Championship at the end of the 2005–06 season, and Campbell-Ryce had played for both clubs during the season, he had the unusual privilege of touring both towns on open-top bus victory parades on successive days.

Barnsley
In early August in 2007, Southend rejected a £250,000 bid from Barnsley for Campbell-Ryce, though he finally completed his move to Barnsley on the deadline day for an undisclosed fee.

He scored his first Barnsley goal on 29 December 2007 in the 2–2 draw with Southampton, cutting in from the right and unleashing a rising piledriver into the top corner. On 26 January 2008, Campbell-Ryce scored the winner in Barnsley's 1–0 away win against his former club Southend in the fourth round of the FA Cup.

In October, Campbell-Ryce signed a new three-year deal at Oakwell, keeping him with Barnsley until the summer of 2011.

In February 2009, he scored at Hillsborough to sink Sheffield Wednesday and complete the first double over the Owls for 63 years and the Reds' first win there since 1983. On 3 May 2009 he scored the winner in a 2–1 win over Plymouth Argyle, a result which kept the club in the Championship.

Bristol City
On 19 January 2010, Campbell-Ryce signed a two-and-a-half-year deal with fellow Championship club Bristol City for an undisclosed fee. He made his debut in a 0–6 loss against Cardiff City on 26 January. Manager Keith Millen often used Campbell-Ryce as a wingback in his 3–5–2 formation. He scored his first goal for the club in the 3–0 win over Cardiff City, just under a year after signing. Campbell-Ryce established himself in the first team, playing regularly until Millen was replaced by Derek McInnes. Under McInnes' management, Campbell-Ryce started only two first-team games.

In order to get playing time in the first-team, Campbell-Ryce joined League One club Leyton Orient on loan until the end of the season, his second spell at the club. On 10 March 2012, Campbell-Ryce made his debut in a 2–0 loss against Tranmere Rovers and scored his first goal since his return in a 2–1 loss against Hartlepool United on 28 April 2012. He was released by Bristol City on 1 May 2012.

Notts County
Campbell-Ryce signed a two-year deal with League One club Notts County in July 2012. In the 2012–13 season Campbell-Ryce played 34 league matches and scored 9 goals.

Sheffield United
On 19 May 2014, Campbell-Ryce signed a two-year deal with Sheffield United which becomes effective on 1 July 2014 when his contract with Notts County expired; Campbell-Ryce was offered a new contract with the Magpies, as well as a number of other clubs, but turned it down in favour of United. On 26 February 2015, Campbell-Ryce joined former club Notts County on loan for the rest of the season with the option of a recall after 28 days. Campbell-Ryce spent the rest of the 2015–16 season on loan at Chesterfield, before being released by the Blades.

Barnet
Campbell-Ryce signed for Barnet in August 2016.

Carlisle United
Campbell-Ryce signed for fellow League Two club Carlisle United on 1 February 2018, joining for an undisclosed fee and on a short-term contract until the end of the 2017–18 season. The move reunited him with Carlisle manager Keith Curle, who he had previously played under at Notts County. He made his Carlisle debut two days after signing, on 3 February 2018, coming on as a second-half substitute in a 4–3 away loss at Wycombe Wanderers. At the end of the season, having made nine appearances during his three months with the club, he was released by Carlisle.

Stevenage
Campbell-Ryce signed for League Two club Stevenage on a free transfer on 29 May 2018. He was released by Stevenage at the end of the 2018–19 season.

Colchester United
Campbell-Ryce joined Colchester United on 19 August 2019, joining as coach for the under-23 team where he was also registered to play as an over-age player. He retired from playing at the end of the 2019–20 season.

Coaching career
On 16 August 2022, Campbell-Ryce was appointed as a coach supporting the England youth teams as part of The Football Association and Professional Footballers' Association's joint England Elite Coach Programme (EECP).

International career
Campbell-Ryce represented Jamaica between 2003 and 2009 winning 18 caps.

Career statistics

References

External links

Living people
1983 births
Footballers from Lambeth
Association football midfielders
English people of Jamaican descent
Jamaican footballers
Jamaica international footballers
Black British sportspeople
Charlton Athletic F.C. players
Leyton Orient F.C. players
Wimbledon F.C. players
Chesterfield F.C. players
Rotherham United F.C. players
Southend United F.C. players
Colchester United F.C. players
Barnsley F.C. players
Bristol City F.C. players
Notts County F.C. players
Sheffield United F.C. players
Barnet F.C. players
Carlisle United F.C. players
Stevenage F.C. players
English Football League players
Premier League players
2009 CONCACAF Gold Cup players
Colchester United F.C. non-playing staff
Peterborough United F.C. non-playing staff